is the largest chemical company in Japan, ranked No. 9 in Forbes Global 2000 for chemical sector. Shin-Etsu has the largest global market share for polyvinyl chloride, semiconductor silicon, and photomask substrates.

The company was named one of Thomson Reuters Top 100 Global Innovators in 2011, 2012, 2013 and 2014.

“Shin-Etsu” in the company's name derives from Shin'etsu Region, where the company established the first chemical plant as Shin-Etsu Nitrogen Fertilizer in 1926, though the company today is headquartered in Tokyo and has its manufacturing locations in 14 countries worldwide.

Segments
Shin-Etsu splits its business into three distinct groups:
 Organic and inorganic chemicals
 Main products: polyvinyl chloride (PVC), silicones, methanol, chloromethane, cellulose derivatives, polyvinyl alcohols, caustic soda, and silicon metals
 Electronics materials
 Main products: semiconductor silicon, organic materials, rare earth magnets for the electronics industry and photoresist products
 Functional materials
 Main products: synthetic quartz, rare earth and rare-earth magnets for general use

References

Further reading
Fingleton, Eamonn (March 2015). Is This The Most Successful Tech Giant You've Never Heard Of?   Forbes

External links
 Official Website: Shin-Etsu Chemical Co., Ltd.
 SE Tylose GmbH & Co. KG

Chemical companies based in Tokyo
Plastics companies of Japan
Silicon wafer producers
Semiconductor companies of Japan
Chemical companies established in 1926
Technology companies established in 1926
Japanese companies established in 1926
Companies listed on the Nagoya Stock Exchange
Companies listed on the Tokyo Stock Exchange
Japanese brands
Non-renewable resource companies established in 1926